Flamborough—Glanbrook is a federal electoral district in Ontario, Canada, that has been represented in the House of Commons of Canada since 2015.

Geography

Flamborough—Glanbrook was created by the 2012 federal electoral boundaries redistribution and was legally defined in the 2013 representation order as the area commencing at the intersection of the easterly limit of the city with the Niagara Escarpment, westerly along said escarpment to Redhill Creek, westerly along the creek to Mountain Brow Boulevard, southerly along said boulevard to Arbour Road, southerly along said road, its intermittent production, Anchor Road and its southerly production to the intersection of Rymal Road East with Glover Road, westerly along Rymal Road East, Rymal Road West and Garner Road East to Glancaster Road, southerly along said road to the electric power transmission line situated northerly of Grassyplain Drive, westerly along said transmission line to Trinity Road, northerly along said road and Highway No. 52 North to the Canadian National Railway, easterly along said railway to Highway No. 403, northeasterly along said highway to the northerly limit of Hamilton, and then in an uneven manner to the point of commencement.

Demographics
According to the Canada 2021 Census
Ethnic groups: 76.8% White, 7.4% South Asian, 3.8% Black, 2.3% Arab, 2.0% Indigenous, 1.3% Filipino, 1.5% Latin American, 1.3% West Asian, 1.0% Chinese
Languages: 74.7% English, 2.0% Arabic, 1.7% Italian, 1.4% Punjabi, 1.4% Urdu, 1.3% Spanish, 1.3% Polish, 1.2% Portuguese, 1.0% French
Religions: 61.3% Christian (31.2% Catholic, 4.5% United Church, 4.0% Anglican, 3.1% Christian Orthodox, 2.2% Reformed, 1.9% Presbyterian, 1.4% Pentecostal, 1.3% Baptist, 11.7% Other), 6.2% Muslim, 1.8% Hindu, 1.8% Sikh, 27.7% None
Median income: $46,800 (2020) 
Average income: $59,750 (2020)

History

Flamborough—Glanbrook came into effect upon the call of the 42nd Canadian federal election, scheduled for October 2015. It was created out of parts of the electoral districts of Ancaster—Dundas—Flamborough—Westdale, Niagara West—Glanbrook and Hamilton Mountain.

Members of Parliament

This riding has elected the following Members of Parliament:

Election results

References

Ontario federal electoral districts
Politics of Hamilton, Ontario
2013 establishments in Ontario